Chest most commonly refers to:

The chest is a part of the anatomy of humans and various other animals located between the neck and the abdomen.

Chest, a piece of furniture used for storage

Chest may also refer to:

Places
Chest Creek, a tributary of the West Branch Susquehanna River in Pennsylvania, United States
Chest Township, Pennsylvania (disambiguation), name of two towns in Pennsylvania

Arts, entertainment, and media
 Chest (album)
Chest (journal), a medical journal covering chest diseases and related issues
The Chest, an episode of Comedy Premieres

Furniture and storage
Chest of drawers, also called (especially in North American English) a bureau, a type of cabinet (a piece of furniture) that has multiple parallel, horizontal drawers usually stacked one above another

Other uses
Chest (mechanical engineering)
CHEST (UK Higher Education) Combined Higher Education Software Team
 American College of Chest Physicians (CHEST)

See also

Hope chest (disambiguation)